FUB-JWH-018 (also known as FUB-018) is a naphthoylindole-based synthetic cannabinoid, representing a molecular hybrid of JWH-018 and AB-FUBICA or ADB-FUBICA.

Legal status
In the United States, all CB1 receptor agonists of the 3-(1-naphthoyl)indole class such as FUB-JWH-018 are Schedule I Controlled Substances.

As of October 2015 FUB-JWH-018 is a controlled substance in China.

See also
 AB-FUBINACA
 ADB-FUBINACA
 AMB-FUBINACA
 CHM-018
 FUB-144
 FUB-APINACA
 FDU-PB-22
 FUB-PB-22
 MDMB-FUBICA
 MDMB-FUBINACA

References

Designer drugs
Naphthoylindoles
Fluoroarenes